The Challenge Cup is a European rugby league competition held annually since 1896.

Challenge Cup may also refer to:

Australian football
 Challenge Cup (Australian rules football), a historic football competition in Australia during the late 1800s

Figure skating
 International Challenge Cup

Football (soccer)
AFC Challenge Cup, a former football competition in the Asian Football Confederation
Challenge Cup (Austria-Hungary) 1897–1911
Challenge Trophy, in Canada
Carolina Challenge Cup, in South Carolina, U.S.
FA Cup, officially the Football Association Challenge Cup, in England
Lebanese Challenge Cup
Malaysia Challenge Cup
National Challenge Cup, now U.S. Open Cup, in the U.S.
Newfoundland and Labrador Challenge Cup, in Canada
Nigeria FA Cup, or Challenge Cup
Northern Premier League Challenge Cup, in England
NWSL Challenge Cup, an American women's competition
Scottish Challenge Cup

Handball
EHF Challenge Cup, now EHF European Cup

Ice hockey
Challenge Cup (UK ice hockey)
Challenge Cup (ice hockey), an international tournament held annually in Canada
1979 Challenge Cup (ice hockey), between the Soviet Union and the National Hockey League
IIHF Challenge Cup of Asia
Dominion Hockey Challenge Cup, now Stanley Cup, the championship trophy of the National Hockey League in North America

Rugby league
 Women's Challenge Cup, the women's version of the men's rugby league competition
 Wheelchair Challenge Cup, the wheelchair version of the men's rugby league competition

Rugby union
 EPCR Challenge Cup, a European rugby union competition 
 WRU Challenge Cup, a rugby union competition in Wales
 Yorkshire Cup (rugby union), originally the Yorkshire Challenge Cup, in England

Volleyball
CEV Challenge Cup, a European competition
CEV Women's Challenge Cup,  a European competition

Research
Challenge Cup Competition of Science Achievement in China

See also